Pierre Mercier (2 March 1937 – 13 November 2020) was a Canadian politician.

References

1937 births
2020 deaths
Members of the National Assembly of Quebec
Quebec Liberal Party MNAs
French Quebecers